Organic clothing is clothing made from materials raised in or grown in compliance with organic agricultural standards. Organic clothing may be composed of Cotton, Jute, Linen, Silk, Ramie, or Wool. In the United States, textiles do not need to be 100% organic to use the organic label. A more general term is organic textiles, which includes both apparel and home textiles. The technical requirements in terms of certification and origin generally remain same for organic clothing and organic textiles.

See also 
 Organic cotton
 Organic Baby Products
 Organic food culture
 Organic wool
 Sustainable clothing

References 

Clothing by material
Sustainable technologies